The Grømstad-Posten was a Norwegian newspaper, published in Grimstad in Aust-Agder county.

The paper was started in 1884 as Andvake before being renamed the Grømstad-Posten in 1887. It ceased publication in 1904, but was revived in 1945 before folding permanently in 1951.

References

1884 establishments in Norway
1904 disestablishments in Norway
1945 establishments in Norway
1951 disestablishments in Norway
Mass media in Aust-Agder
Defunct newspapers published in Norway
Grimstad
Norwegian-language newspapers
Newspapers established in 1884
Publications disestablished in 1904
Newspapers established in 1945
Publications disestablished in 1951